This is a list of endorsements for declared or potential candidates in the Republican primaries for the 2024 United States presidential election.



Ron DeSantis

Nikki Haley

Perry Johnson

Mike Pence

Mike Pompeo

Vivek Ramaswamy

Donald Trump

Notes

References

2024 United States Republican presidential primaries
Republican Party